Bobby McDonagh (born 29 June 1954) is a former Irish diplomat.

Biography
He was educated in Gonzaga College, Dublin and graduated from Balliol College, Oxford with an Master of Arts (MA) (Greats/Classics). He was elected President of the Oxford Union in 1974.

He entered the Irish diplomatic service in 1977. His father, Bob McDonagh, and brother,  Philip McDonagh, also served as ambassadors in the service.

He is regarded as an expert on European Union affairs, having spent 23 years of his career either in the corridors of Brussels or in the EU division of the Irish Department of Foreign Affairs.
This included periods in the Secretariat of the European Parliament, periods in the cabinets of two European Commissioners and a period (2005–2009) as the Irish Permanent Representative to the EU.

He served as Director General of the EU division of the Irish Department of Foreign Affairs (2001–2005).

He was Ambassador of Ireland to the United Kingdom (2009–2013), which included the period of the visit of Queen Elizabeth II to Ireland.

He served as Ambassador of Ireland to Italy (2013–2017) and retired in 2018.

Publications

 "Irish Friends and Friends of Ireland..." London Speeches 2009–2013, (IIEA 2014)
 The IGC: How the Deal was Done-an account of the negotiation of the EU Constitutional Treaty (contained in The Genesis and Destiny of the European Constitution, Bruylant 2007).
 Original Sin in a Brave New World-the Paradox of Europe (IIEA 1997)

References

External links
Book Launch Speech

Living people
1954 births
People from Washington, D.C.
People educated at Gonzaga College
Alumni of Balliol College, Oxford
Presidents of the Oxford Union
Ambassadors of Ireland to Italy
Ambassadors of Ireland to Malaysia
Ambassadors of Ireland to the United Kingdom
Permanent Representatives of Ireland to the European Union
20th-century Irish people
21st-century Irish people
21st-century diplomats
Irish diplomats